Shaba Krishnarao Desai (25 March 1931 – 12 November 2008) was an Indian politician, teacher and freedom fighter from Goa. He was a former Member of the Goa Legislative Assembly, representing the Quepem Assembly constituency from 1967 to 1972. He also served as a Deputy Speaker of the Goa Legislative Assembly from 1971 to 1972. He was a member of the  Rastra Seva Dal.

Early and personal life
Shaba Krishnarao Desai was born in Quepem. He completed his Secondary School Certificate from D.T.C. School, Belgaum. He was also an alumnus of Sahitya Pradna, D.M. Fine Arts and Commercial Art and Sir J. J. School of Art, Bombay (now Mumbai). He was married to Sushama Desai.

Career
Desai joined Indian National Congress Goa as an underground worker while celebrating the Tere Khol Day. He was arrested and incarcerated for 27 days. Desai was also a member of the Praja Socialist Party till 1958.

References

1931 births
2008 deaths
Indian politicians
Goa, Daman and Diu MLAs 1967–1972
Indian National Congress politicians from Goa
Maharashtrawadi Gomantak Party politicians